The City of Fort Lupton is a Statutory City located in southern Weld County, Colorado, United States. The town population was 7,955 at the 2020 United States Census. Fort Lupton is a part of the Greeley, Colorado Metropolitan Statistical Area and the Front Range Urban Corridor.

History
The city was named for Lieutenant Lancaster Lupton, who built a trading post on Adobe Creek in 1838. The trading post, Fort Lupton, has been reconstructed near the site of the original fort using some of the original adobe bricks at the South Platte Valley Historical Park, which was established by the South Platte Valley Historical Society northwest of the city of Fort Lupton. It is a historical park about early area settlement.

Geography
The city of Fort Lupton  is located at  (40.0849, -104.8030).

At the 2020 United States Census, the town had a total area of  including  of water.

Demographics

As of the census of 2000, there were 6,787 people, 2,099 households, and 1,677 families residing in the city. The racial makeup of the city was 70.34% White, 0.43% African American, 1.36% Native American, 0.83% Asian, 0.03% Pacific Islander, 22.65% from other races, and 4.38% from two or more races. Hispanic or Latino of any race were 47.38% of the population.

There were 2,099 households, out of which 48.2% had children under the age of 18 living with them, 61.0% were married couples living together, 13.1% had a female householder with no husband present, and 20.1% were non-families. 16.9% of all households were made up of individuals, and 6.4% had someone living alone who was 65 years of age or older.  The average household size was 3.23 and the average family size was 3.62.

In the city, the population was spread out, with 34.4% under the age of 18, 10.4% from 18 to 24, 30.9% from 25 to 44, 17.7% from 45 to 64, and 6.6% who were 65 years of age or older.  The median age was 29 years. For every 100 females, there were 103.9 males.  For every 100 females age 18 and over, there were 100.6 males.

The median income for a household in the city was $40,917, and the median income for a family was $45,348. Males had a median income of $34,368 versus $23,849 for females. The per capita income for the city was $15,649.  About 11.3% of families and 13.3% of the population were below the poverty line, including 15.3% of those under age 18 and 17.2% of those age 65 or over.

Education
Fort Lupton is part of Weld County Public School District RE-8, which includes Fort Lupton Middle School Fort Lupton High School, Butler Elementary, Twombly Elementary, Little Trappers Preschool, and Kenneth Homyak PK-8.  As of 2013, Fort Lupton High School had 560 students in grades 9-12.  A controversy arose at the high school in September 2013 when a group of parents sought to remove the novel Looking for Alaska, the 2006 Michael L. Printz Award winner by John Green from the school's curriculum.

Notable people
Brian Shaw, leading American strongman, placed first in the 2011, 2013, 2015, and 2016 World's Strongest Man.
John Naka, Japanese-America bonsai grandmaster, was born in and spent his first eight years there.

See also

Colorado
Bibliography of Colorado
Index of Colorado-related articles
Outline of Colorado
List of counties in Colorado
List of municipalities in Colorado
List of places in Colorado
List of statistical areas in Colorado
Front Range Urban Corridor
North Central Colorado Urban Area
Denver-Aurora, CO Combined Statistical Area
Greeley, CO Metropolitan Statistical Area

References

External links

City of Fort Lupton website
CDOT map of the City of Fort Lupton

Cities in Colorado
Cities in Weld County, Colorado